Thomas Jermyn, 2nd Baron Jermyn (10 November 1633 – 1 April 1703) was an English politician who sat in the House of Commons from 1679 until he inherited a peerage in 1684.

Biography
Jermyn was the son of Thomas Jermyn (d.1659) of Rushbrooke Hall in Suffolk, by his wife Rebecca Rodway, the heiress of William Rodway. He served as a captain of foot in Jersey from 1661 to 1679. From 1662 to 1679 he was Lieutenant Governor of Jersey. In 1673 Jermyn was elected as a Member of Parliament for Bury St Edmunds in Suffolk. In 1674 he was appointed a justice of the peace for the county. In parliament, Jermyn voted against the first exclusion bill during the Exclusion Crisis. He continued to oppose exclusion in subsequent votes, but he made no recorded speeches and was not appointed to any committees. Jermyn held the seat until 1684, when, by special remainder, he became Baron Jermyn on the death of his uncle Henry Jermyn, 1st Earl of St Albans and was elevated to the House of Lords. In 1684, he also inherited the position of Governor of Jersey, holding the role until his death. Between 1685 and 1687 he was a captain of the 12th Regiment of Foot.

Despite his opposition to exclusion, Jermyn was a supporter of the Glorious Revolution in 1688 and he signed the Association of 1696. He died at his townhouse at Spring Gardens in 1703. He died without male issue and was succeeded in his title by his brother, the former Jacobite, Henry Jermyn, 1st Baron Dover. Jermyn's estate, valued at £15,000 per year, was divided among his four surviving adult daughters.

Marriage and issue

In 1659 he married Mary Merry, a daughter of Henry Merry of Barton Blount, Derbyshire, by whom he had five daughters and co-heiresses:
Henrietta Maria Jermyn (1665 – 27 December 1698), who married Thomas Bond. Her ledger stone survives in the Church of St. Nicholas, Rushbrooke, Suffolk.
Mary Jermyn, who married Sir Robert Davers, 2nd Baronet
Merelina Jermyn, who married, firstly, Sir Thomas Spring, 3rd Baronet, and, secondly Sir William Gage, 2nd Baronet.
Penelope Jermyn, who married Grey James Grove.
Delariviera Jermyn (1666–1708), who married Sir Symonds D'Ewes, 3rd Baronet of Stowlangtoft, Suffolk. Her ledger stone survives in St George's Church, Stowlangtoft.

References

1633 births
1703 deaths
2
Governors of Jersey
English MPs 1679
English MPs 1680–1681
English MPs 1681
Thomas
People from Rushbrooke with Rougham
Politicians from Bury St Edmunds
Suffolk Regiment officers